Jakhanian is a constituency of the Uttar Pradesh Legislative Assembly covering the city of Jakhanian in the Ghazipur district of Uttar Pradesh, India.

Jakhanian is one of five assembly constituencies in the Ghazipur Lok Sabha constituency. Since 2008, this assembly constituency is numbered 373 amongst 403 constituencies.

Election results

2022

2017
Suheldev Bharatiya Samaj Party candidate Triveni Ram won in 2017 Uttar Pradesh Legislative Elections defeating Samajwadi Party candidate Gareeb by a margin of 5,157 votes.

References

External links
 

Assembly constituencies of Uttar Pradesh
Politics of Ghazipur district